Timir Chanda (born 1 January 1975) is a former Indian cricketer, coach and administrator. An opening bowler, he played first-class and List A cricket for Tripura from 1995 to 2013.

In the Ranji Trophy in 2010-11, Chanda took 4 for 35 and 7 for 116 in Tripura's seven-wicket victory over Goa at Porvorim. His best bowling figures were 8 for 133 against Himachal Pradesh in 2011–12, when Himachal Pradesh nevertheless won by an innings. He scored 134, his only century, in a drawn match against Goa in 2002–03.

He represents the United Friends cricket club on the executive committee of the Tripura Cricket Association.

References

External links

1975 births
Living people
People from Agartala
Indian cricketers
Tripura cricketers
East Zone cricketers